Poço do Canto is a freguesia ("civil parish") in the municipality of Mêda, Portugal. The population in 2011 was 443, in an area of 16.22 km2.

References

Freguesias of Mêda